Janet Anne Young (born 22 October 1951) is a former professional tennis player from Australia.

Biography

Professional tennis
Young competed on the WTA Tour in the 1970s and won a total of three doubles titles, all of which came partnering Evonne Goolagong. The pair were finalists in eight tournaments across the 1973 season and semi-finalists at the Australian Open, Wimbledon Championships and US Open.

As a singles player, Young won the Queensland Open and South Australian Championships in 1973, both non-tour events. At the 1973 Wimbledon Championships, she won through to the fourth round, where she faced Chris Evert. She took Evert to a third set, which she lost 6–8, having led 4–0.

Young was a doubles player in Australia's winning Federation Cup teams in 1973 and 1974. Teaming with Evonne Goolagong, they remained unbeaten and only dropped one set across both campaigns.

In addition to her performances with Goolagong, Young also reached Grand Slam doubles semi-finals with Lesley Hunt (at the 1974 Australian Open) and Kym Ruddell (at the 1977 Australian Open).

Later career
Young has a doctorate in sports psychology and works as a senior lecturer in the College of Sport & Exercise Science at Melbourne's Victoria University. She served on the board of Tennis Australia from 2008 to 2016.

WTA Tour finals

Doubles (3–5)

See also
List of Australia Fed Cup team representatives

References

External links
 
 
 
 

1951 births
Living people
Australian female tennis players
Universiade medalists in tennis
Tennis players from Melbourne
Australian women academics
Academic staff of the Victoria University, Melbourne
Universiade silver medalists for Australia
Universiade bronze medalists for Australia
Medalists at the 1970 Summer Universiade
Medalists at the 1973 Summer Universiade